¿Quién es la máscara? (abbreviated as La máscara) is a Uruguayan reality singing competition television series that premiered on Teledoce on May 5, 2022. It is part of the Masked Singer franchise which began in South Korea and features celebrities singing songs while wearing head-to-toe costumes and face masks concealing their identities. Hosted by Maximiliano de la Cruz, the program employs Emil Abdul, Fabián Delgado, Sofía Rodríguez and Patricia Wolf, who serve as panelists who guess the celebrities' identities by interpreting clues provided to them throughout the season.

Production 
In November 2021 it was reported that Teledoce was negotiating to acquire the rights to Masked Singer, with the aim of producing it in 2022, as one of its big bets for its sixtieth anniversary. On January 3, 2022, the adaptation of the format was formally announced under the title of ¿Quién es la máscara? (Spanish for Who is the mask?).

Following the announcement of the series, it was confirmed that the permanent panel of "investigators" would consist of dancer and choreographer Emir Abdul Gani, presenter and journalist Sofía Rodríguez, singer and songwriter Fabián Delgado, and model and television personality Patricia Wolf. In late March, Maximiliano de la Cruz was confirmed as the host of the show.

In late April 2022, it was revealed that Camila Rajchman and Leticia Píriz would join the show to present behind the scenes and manage social networks respectively. The show's air date was confirmed through its official Instagram account for May 5, 2022. On October 27, 2022, the competition was renewed for a second series in 2023.

Series overview

Season 1

Episodes

Week 1 (5 May)

Week 2 (12 May)

Week 3 (19 May)

Week 4 (26 May)

Week 5 (2 June)

Week 6 (9 June)

Week 7 (16 June)

Week 8 (23 June)

Week 9 (30 June)

Week 10 (7 July)

Week 11 (14 July) 
 Guest performance: "Tusa" by Karol G and Nicki Minaj performed by Unicornio

Week 12 (21 July) 
 Guest performance: "Solo Se Vive Una Vez" by Azúcar Moreno performed by Hombre Disco

Week 13 (28 July)

Week 14 (4 August) 
 Guest performance:  "Don't You Remember" by Adele performed by Karina la Princesita as "Unicornio"

Week 15 (11 August) 
 Guest performance: "Noche de Rock" by Trotsky Vengarán performed by Celso Cuadro as "Hombre Disco"

Week 15 (18 August) - Finale

References

External links 

 Official website
 

Masked Singer
2022 Uruguayan television series debuts
2020s Uruguayan television series debuts
Spanish-language television shows
Uruguayan reality television series
Uruguayan television series
Teledoce original programming